Brent Weinbach is an American stand-up comedian, actor, director, and pianist based in Los Angeles, California. He is known for his experimental style and abstract, deadpan delivery. He is a graduate of the University of California, Berkeley and was formerly a professional jazz pianist and substitute teacher.

Weinbach is also known for creating various video sensations such as Gangster Party Line, Mind Jack, and Ultimate Drumming Technique and is the co-creator and co-director of the cult web series, Pound House alongside DJ Douggpound which was nominated for a Streamy Award. Brent is a recipient of the Andy Kaufman Award, which recognizes innovation in stand-up comedy and was a finalist in the 2008 San Francisco Comedy Competition.  Brent has appeared on Conan, Lopez Tonight, and various shows on Comedy Central.  He also toured with the Comedians of Comedy and has performed at such festivals as Coachella, SF Sketchfest, Bumbershoot and the Just for Laughs Festival.

His first album, inspired by Joe Frank, is Tales from the Brown Side. His second album, released in September 2009, is called The Night Shift and features a blend of live recorded comedy, studio recordings, and original musical compositions." His third album Mostly Live was released in 2012.

He appeared with a small role in the film Medicine for Melancholy in 2008. In 2010, he began hosting The Legacy Music Hour, a podcast in which he and co-host Rob F. Switch discuss retro video game music from the 1980s and 1990s, along with crossover appearances with Laser Time podcast. In December 2016, Weinbach appeared as a guest on the Let's Play webseries Game Grumps, commentating over Rare's Time Lord.

He is half-Filipino and half-Jewish along with his sister Laura Weinbach of the band Foxtails Brigade which includes his brother-in-law Anton Patzner.

In 2022, he won the Best Screenplay (spirit of Los Angeles award) with Bruno Kohfield-Galeano at the Los Angeles International Film Festival.

Filmography

Discography
 Tales From The Brown Side (2004)
 The Night Shift (2009)
 Mostly Live (2012)
 Appealing to the Mainstream (2017)
Christmas Piano (2017)

References

External links

The Legacy Music Hour
 

Living people
American male film actors
American stand-up comedians
American people of Jewish descent
American people of Filipino descent
Male actors from San Francisco
Comedians from California
21st-century American comedians
Place of birth missing (living people)
Year of birth missing (living people)